Osas Ighodaro (Osariemen Martha Elizabeth Ighodaro; born 26 October) is a Nigerian American actress, producer, host and humanitarian. She won the Miss Black USA Pageant in 2010, and founded the Joyful Joy Foundation, an initiative that raises funds to fight malaria. She co-hosted the 2014 Africa Magic Viewers Choice Awards, and played Adanna (Danni) on the soap opera Tinsel. Moreover, she won Best TV Actress of the Year at the 2014 ELOY Awards. Osas emerged as the highest-grossing Nollywood actress of 2018, and was awarded Best Actress in a Drama at the 2022 AMVCA for her role in Rattlesnake: The Ahanna Story.

Biography
Osas Ighodaro was born in Bronx, New York, United States, to Nigerian parents from Edo State. She obtained her first degree in broadcasting journalism with dual minors in entrepreneurship and theater from Pennsylvania State University. She further obtained a master's degree in fine arts from the Actors Studio Drama School at Pace University. She moved to Nigeria in 2012 with the intention of returning to the United States after six months, but secured various acting roles including Adanna in Tinsel and has remained in the country ever since. She hosted the Maltina Dance All Reality show. She is the founder of the Joyful Joy Foundation and is a member of Alpha Kappa Alpha sorority.

She joined MTV Shuga for series four in October 2019.

She was listed as a top female celebrity of 2020.

Personal life
She married Gbenro Ajibade in June 2015. They had their first child in 2016. They divorced shortly after.

Filmography

Films
{| class="wikitable sortable"
|-
! Year 
! Title 
! Role
! scope="col" class="unsortable" | Notes 
|-
|rowspan="3"| 2006
| Killa Season
| Shinae
| Video
|-
| Hookers in Revolt
| Delilah
| Video
|-
| My African Uncle
| -
| Short
|-
| 2007
| Luggage
| Sade's sister (singing voice)
| Short
|-
|rowspan="3"| 2008
| Across a Bloodied Ocean
| Nafisa
| Short
|-
| Cadillac Records
| Maid
| 
|-
| Jewslim
| Rochelle Whitman
| 
|-
|rowspan="2"| 2009
| Notorious
| Party Girl
| 
|-
| Park Sharks
| Neglected Girlfriend
| 
|-
|rowspan="2"| 2010
| Computer Love
| Chastity
| 
|-
| The Tested
| Sheena
| 
|-
|rowspan="3"| 2011
| Computer Love
| Chastity
| 
|-
| He Said, She Said: A Romantic Comedy
| Donna
| Video
|-
| Psa 64
| Woman Scorned 64
| Short
|-
|rowspan="3"| 2015
| The Department
| Tolu Okoye
| 
|-
| Gbomo Gbomo Express
| Cassandra
| 
|-
| Where Children Play
| Nia
| 
|-
|rowspan="2"| 2016
| Entreat
| Margaret
| 
|-
| Put a Ring on it
| Eki
| 
|-
|rowspan="5"| 2017
| Idahosa Trails
| Osamuede
| 
|-
| Little Drops of Happy
| Mano Ojo
| 
|-
| Wurukum Roundabout
| -
| 
|-
| Countdown
| Helen
| 
|-
| White Pickett Fence
| Brenda Caldwell
| Short
|-
|rowspan="5"| 2018
| New Money
| Angela Nwachukwu
| 
|-
| A Rose for Freddy
| Kemi
| 
|-
| Merry Men: The Real Yoruba Demons
| Chidinma
| 
|-
| We Don’t Live Here Anymore
| Leslie
| 
|-
| King of Boys
| Sade Bello
| 
|-
|rowspan="3"| 2019
| My Mfon - an election day story
| Sola Bassey
| Short
|-
| Bling Lagosians
| Demidun
| 
|-
| Your Excellency
| Candy
| 
|-
|rowspan="5"| 2020
| Kenim O Presents: A Second Husband
| Tope
| Short
|-
| Double Strings
| Detective Isoken
| 
|-
| Mama Drama
| Mena
| 
|-
| Rattlesnake: The Ahanna Story
| Amara
| 
|-
| Ratnik
| Sarah Bello
| 
|-
|rowspan="6"| 2021
| Namaste Wahala
| Preemo
| 
|-
| Mamba's Diamond
| Eloho
| 
|-
| Keeping Promise
| Teni
| 
|-
| Bad Comments
| Hilda
| 
|-
| The Ghost and the Tout Too
| Amoke
| 
|-
| Who Lived at Number 6
| Dimma
| 
|-
|rowspan="4"| 2022
| Man of God  
| Teju
| 
|-
| Knee Down
| Ese
| Short
|-
| Single Not Searching 
| Kai
| 
|-
| Conversations in Transit 
| Adeola
| <ref>{{Cite web|url=https://www.pulse.ng/entertainment/movies/rogers-ofime-wraps-up-production-for-conversations-in-transit/ymgncmc|title = Rogers Ofime wraps up production for 'Conversations in Transit}}</ref>
|-
|}

Television

Theater

 Fela & the Kalakuta Queens 
 For Coloured Girls (Nigerian adaptation)
 Underground Dolores He Said, She Said How Sweet Platanos Y Collard Greens Revenge of a King Joe Turners Come and Gone Coloured Museum''

Awards and nominations

References

External links
 Official website
 
 Osas Ighodaro Ajibade biography with Huffington Post
 Osas Ighodaro interview with Toke Makinwa

Pace University alumni
Donald P. Bellisario College of Communications alumni
American people of Nigerian descent
Nigerian television actresses
Nigerian television personalities
Living people
People from the Bronx
Edo people
Miss Black USA delegates
Nigerian beauty pageant contestants
Nigerian film actresses
21st-century Nigerian actresses
American beauty pageant winners
American film actresses
21st-century American actresses
Nigerian humanitarians
American emigrants to Nigeria
1983 births
American television hosts
Nigerian television producers
Pennsylvania State University alumni
American television producers
Actresses from Edo State
American beauty pageant contestants
Nigerian television presenters
Nigerian film award winners